Ronald Vincent Jaworski, nicknamed Jaws, (born March 23, 1951) is an American former professional football player who was a quarterback in the National Football League (NFL) from 1973 to 1989 during which he played for the Los Angeles Rams, Philadelphia Eagles, Miami Dolphins, and Kansas City Chiefs. As quarterback of the Philadelphia Eagles in 1981, Jaworski led the Eagles to their first ever Super Bowl appearance in Super Bowl XV.

Jaworski later was an NFL analyst on ESPN. He is the CEO of Ron Jaworski Golf Management, Inc. based in Mt.Laurel, New Jersey, and manages golf courses in South Jersey, and 1 in Downingtown, PA. He also owned a part interest in the Philadelphia Soul of the Arena Football League, where he served as executive committee chairman for the league.

Jaworski was nicknamed Jaws by Philadelphia 76ers player Doug Collins prior to the Eagles' Super Bowl appearance, and the nickname has stuck. Jaworski started the vast majority of Eagles games between 1977 and 1986. In 1991, he was named to the Philadelphia Eagles Honor Roll.

Early years and education
Jaworski was born and raised in Lackawanna, New York. A three-sport star in high school, he turned down a Major League Baseball offer from the St. Louis Cardinals to attend college at Youngstown State University, where he was nicknamed "Rifle Ron" and the "Polish Rifle", a reference to his Polish ethnicity.

At Youngstown State, he showcased his skills as a quarterback for a pass-oriented offense, earning a selection in the Senior Bowl.  Jaworski set several school records, including most pass completions in a season (139), pass completions in a career (325), passing yardage in a season (2,123), passing yardage in a career (4,612), most touchdown passes in a single game (4), and most touchdown passes in a season (18). His 32 career touchdown passes ranked him second in school history. Jaworski was inducted into Youngstown State's athletic hall of fame in 1986.

Professional career

Los Angeles Rams
Jaworski entered the 1973 NFL Draft and was selected in the second round by the Los Angeles Rams, where he originally was a third-string quarterback. Due to injuries to John Hadl and James Harris, Jaworski saw considerable playing time in 1975.

Jaworski made his playoff debut in the 1975 divisional round game against the St. Louis Cardinals, where he threw 12-of-23 for 203 yards and a touchdown while running for a touchdown. The Rams scored 28 first-half points to win 35–23. The win sent the Rams to their second straight NFC Championship Game against the Dallas Cowboys. Despite the divisional-round win, Jaworski was not the initial starting quarterback for the title game, which was played at home in Los Angeles, since Harris threw the first two passes of the game for them, one of which resulted in an interception. The interception led the Rams to replace Harris with Jaworski during the game, who went 11-of-22 for 147 passing yards and two interceptions while being sacked five times as the Cowboys eliminated the Rams from the playoffs 37–7.

In 1976, Pat Haden was promoted to be the primary starting quarterback, but Jaworski made two starts and appeared in three other games, winning both starts despite throwing a combined 20-of-52 for 273 yards with one touchdown and five interceptions.

Philadelphia Eagles
In the spring of 1977, Jaworski was traded by the Rams to the Philadelphia Eagles for former All-Pro tight end Charle Young. The trade was illegal under NFL rules since both Jaworski and Young had completed their contracts. But no objections to the deal were raised, so it was permitted to stand.

With a young Dick Vermeil as coach, Jaworski was given the opportunity to start for the up-and-coming Eagles. Vermeil stood by Jaworski, and soon the Eagles emerged as a playoff team. In the 1978 season, the Eagles snuck into the playoffs as the newly-instituted fifth seed, where they faced the Atlanta Falcons in Atlanta. Jaworski provided the first touchdown of the game on a 13-yard pass to Harold Carmichael that gave the Eagles a 6–0 lead at halftime. Despite leading 13–0 in the 4th quarter, Jaworski and the Eagles could not stop Steve Bartkowski in the last five minutes, and the Falcons won the game 14–13 despite Atlanta having five turnovers. Jaworski brought the Eagles to the Falcons' 16-yard-line with just 13 seconds to play, but punter/kicker Mike Michel missed what would have been a game-winning 34-yard field goal. In the loss, Jaworski threw 19-of-35 for 190 yards with one touchdown while being sacked three times. As of 2021, the Falcons-Eagles playoff game was the first and only time in NFL history where both starting quarterbacks were of Polish heritage.

Vermeil slowly built the Eagles into a Super Bowl team, and Jaworski was its leader on offense along with future Hall of Fame wide receiver Harold Carmichael and Pro Bowl running back Wilbert Montgomery. In the next season, Jaworski led the Eagles to another playoff appearance as the #4 seed, where they hosted the Chicago Bears in the first NFL post-season game at Veterans Stadium and first one in Philadelphia since the team's first NFL season in 1960. While Jaworski threw the first touchdown pass of the game to Carmichael, the Bears roared to a 17–10 halftime lead. Jaworski brought the Eagles back, however, throwing both the tying pass and the tie-breaking touchdown to Carmichael and Billy Campfield as the Eagles rallied to beat the Bears 27–17. Jaworski completed 12-of-23 for 204 passing yards with three touchdowns and one interception while being sacked three times.  The Eagles traveled to play the Tampa Bay Buccaneers in the divisional round. In the game, the Buccaneers scored 17 points early before Jaworski threw a touchdown pass in the 2nd quarter to Charlie Smith to make the halftime score 17–7. Despite a final drive by Jaworski that brought the Eagles to the 45-yard line, the Buccaneers won 24–17. In the game, Jaworski threw 15-of-39 for 199 passing yards with two touchdowns and sacks.

Super Bowl season
In 1980, the Eagles started out 11–1 in the regular season, including defeating the eventual Super Bowl champions Oakland Raiders and winning the NFC Eastern Division and the NFC for the first time since 1960. Jaworski had a stellar season and was named the UPI "NFL Player of the Year". Also in that same year, he received the Bert Bell Award, the Maxwell Football Club's Professional Player of the Year award, and the Professional Athlete of the Year award sponsored by Dunlop Rubber. Facing the Minnesota Vikings in Philadelphia in the divisional round, the Eagles trailed 14–7 at halftime, but Jaworski started the second half with a touchdown pass that tied the game. The game featured 11 combined turnovers by both teams, but the Eagles won 31–16. Jaworski was 17-of-38 for 190 passing yards with one touchdown and two interceptions while being sacked twice, including once in the end zone.

In the NFC Championship Game, the Eagles faced their division rival, the Dallas Cowboys. In 12-degree weather, the Eagles pulled off a strong rushing attack for 13 unanswered points in the second half after the game was tied at halftime to win 20–7. Jaworski went 9-of-29 for 91 yards and two interceptions and sacks, and the Eagles advanced to their first ever Super Bowl.

In Super Bowl XV, Jaworski and the Eagles hit a brick wall in the Oakland Raiders. Despite being slight favorites going into the game, the Eagles suffered four turnovers,  including an interception on the opening drive that gave the Raiders the ball at the Eagles' 30-yard line, which led to an eventual touchdown. A 40-yard pass from Jaworski to Rodney Parker would have led to a tying score, but Carmichael was penalized for illegal motion, while a late drive to end the first half led to a missed Tony Franklin field goal to keep it 14–3. From there, the Raiders kept on with their attack to prevail 27–10. Jaworski threw 18-of-38 for 291 yards while throwing a touchdown and three interceptions with a lost fumble.

In 1981, Jaworski led the Eagles to a fourth straight playoff appearance. The Eagles faced off against the New York Giants at home in the wild card round. However, the Eagles could not overcome 20 first-quarter points scored by New York despite their best efforts in a 27–21 loss. Jaworski went 13-of-24 for 154 yards for one touchdown while being sacked three times.

Following a shaky performance in the 1985 season opener, Jaworski was benched and replaced by rookie Randall Cunningham in Week 2; Jaworski subsequently regained the starter's role and performed well, earning NFC Offensive Player of the Week honors in Week 7. He also tied an NFL record with a 99-yard overtime touchdown pass to Mike Quick in 1985 against the Atlanta Falcons. After Jaworski suffered another injury the next season, new Eagles coach Buddy Ryan made Cunningham his starting quarterback for the rest of the season. The team did not re-sign Jaworski at the end of the season and he was subsequently released. He finished with a record of 69 wins, 67 losses and one tie as the Eagles starting quarterback.

Miami Dolphins
In the spring of 1987, he signed with the Miami Dolphins as a backup to quarterback Dan Marino. Jaworski never took the field in 1987, and he saw limited action in 1988.

Kansas City Chiefs
Jaworski moved on to the Kansas City Chiefs in 1989, starting a pair of games in a quarterback rotation that included Steve DeBerg and Steve Pelluer. At one point, he and center Mike Webster formed the second oldest starting QB–center combo in NFL history. He retired at the end of the season.

Career statistics
Jaworski finished his 17-season career with 2,187 completions on 4,117 attempts for 28,190 yards, 179 touchdowns, and 164 interceptions. He rushed for 859 yards and 16 touchdowns. He previously held the record for most consecutive starts by a quarterback with 116, having since been surpassed by Brett Favre, Peyton Manning, Eli Manning, Philip Rivers, Joe Flacco and Matthew Stafford.

When Jaworski retired, he was the Eagles' all time leader in wins, passing yards, pass completions, pass attempts, and passing touchdowns until those totals were broken by Donovan McNabb. As of 2022, Jaworski remains second on the Eagles all time list among quarterbacks for most major passing records with the team, and remains the Eagles' all time leader in losses and interceptions thrown, as well as the longest pass completion in Eagles history.

Awards
In 1979, he and Joe Pisarcik received medals from Pope John Paul II on the occasion of his visit to Philadelphia. Like the Pope, both men are of Polish ancestry, with Jaworski being nicknamed "The Polish Rifle."

He was voted by his teammates as the Ed Block Courage Award recipient in 1985 for the Philadelphia Eagles.

While still playing for the Eagles in 1986, Jaworski was inducted into the YSU Sports Hall of Fame at his collegiate alma mater, Youngstown State University. Along with former Pittsburgh Steelers quarterback Cliff Stoudt (inducted 1987 and Jaworski's successor on the football team, though playing for the Cardinals at this point) and recently retired St. Louis Rams kicker Jeff Wilkins (inducted in 2003), Jaworski is one of only three former YSU football players to be inducted while still active in the NFL.

In 1991, Jaworski was inducted into the National Polish-American Hall of Fame.

In 1992, Jaworski was inducted into the Philadelphia Eagles Honor Roll, and in 1994 he was nominated for admission to the Pro Football Hall of Fame in Canton, Ohio (his first year of eligibility for this as he had retired five years earlier, in 1989).

In 1997, he received the Pinnacle Award from the South Jersey Chamber of Commerce for his outstanding volunteer work and longtime service to South Jersey's business community.

In 1997, Jaworski received the Bert Bell Man of the Year from the Eagles Fly for Leukemia, which is given to the person who had contributed significantly to the NFL.

In 1998, The United Way honored Ron with their Volunteer Leadership Award, which is the highest award given by the United Way.

In 2007, the Father's Day Council of the Greater Philadelphia chapter of the American Diabetes Association selected Ron to receive one of their "Father of the Year" awards.

Post-NFL career

Business
Jaworski was a part owner and team president of the Philadelphia Soul of the Arena Football League. He also served as Chairman of the Executive Committee for the AFL. He is also among the primary investors and advisors for the Elite Football League of India. Other prominent American backers include former Chicago Bears head coach Mike Ditka, former Dallas Cowboys wide receiver Michael Irvin, and NFL linebacker Brandon Chillar. Jaworski is the owner/operator of Valleybrook Country Club in Blackwood, New Jersey, Downingtown County Club in Downingtown PA, Ramblewood country club in Mount Laurel NJ and Running Deer Golf Club in Pittsgrove, New Jersey. In addition, Ron Jaworski Golf Management manages RiverWinds Golf & Tennis Club, West Deptford Township, New Jersey, Honey Run country club in York PA, and Blue Heron Pines Country Club in Egg Harbor City, New Jersey.

Broadcasting
Jaworski's first on-air broadcast experience came in 1976 as the sports director on the Bob Shannon morning show in Orange County, California while Ron was still an NFL player with the Rams. He also worked as a sports commentator for WIP (Ron Jaworski Show, 1988), co-host Celebrity Sports Talk and Eagles wrap-around shows, 1990, and the Eagles post-game show WYSP, 1992.  He was part of ESPN's broadcasting team for the second half of its opening-night Monday Night Football doubleheader on September 11, 2006, with Brad Nessler and Dick Vermeil. Jaworski was also the color commentator for Tampa Bay Buccaneers preseason games on WFLA-TV from 2003 to 2006. In 2007, he replaced Joe Theismann as color commentator for ESPN's Monday Night Football broadcasts, where he and Mike Tirico teamed with Tony Kornheiser (2007–2008) and Jon Gruden (2009–2011). On February 15, 2012 ESPN announced that the Monday Night Football broadcast team would be reduced to just Gruden and Tirico in the booth. Jaworski signed a five-year contract extension with ESPN and would remain an NFL analyst on other programs. In late April 2017, ESPN announced they would be laying off various on-air personalities from their channel. On May 2, 2017, Ed Werder, who was released a few days earlier from ESPN, even breaking the news of his release himself, hinted that Jaworski was also being let go after years with the network. "How is ESPN going to cover the NFL without all of the people who just lost their jobs? What happens without Merril Hoge and Ron Jaworski to NFL Matchup? Are we really about to see a time when ESPN can no longer afford to cover its most valuable property in the way that historically it has?" Werder said. Jaworski has yet to make a statement on if Werder's comments are true or not.
Ron Jaworski has been an analyst for select weeks of Westward One Monday Night Football since 2020.

Jaworski is also a published author. In 2010 his first book, The Games That Changed the Game, was published. The book highlights seven games in NFL history which greatly changed the strategies and tactics used in NFL football.

Personal life
, Jaworski lives in Medford, New Jersey. He and his wife, Liz, have three children.

References
Notes

Bibliography
"Ron(ald) (Vincent) Jaworski." Almanac of Famous People, 9th ed. Thomson Gale, 2007.  Reproduced in Biography Resource Center. Farmington Hills, Mich.: Gale, 2009. http://galenet.galegroup.com/servlet/BioRC.  Document Number: K1601045895.  Fee.  Accessed 2009-12-21 via Fairfax County Public Library.
Biography Index. A cumulative index to biographical material in books and magazines. Volume 12: September 1979-August 1982. New York: H. W. Wilson Co., 1983.

External links

 
 
 Valleybroo Golf

1951 births
Living people
Sportspeople from Buffalo, New York
People from Voorhees Township, New Jersey
American people of Polish descent
American football quarterbacks
Youngstown State Penguins football players
Los Angeles Rams players
Philadelphia Eagles players
Miami Dolphins players
Kansas City Chiefs players
National Conference Pro Bowl players
National Football League announcers
College football announcers
Arena Football League executives
Sportspeople from the Delaware Valley
Players of American football from Buffalo, New York
Players of American football from New Jersey
People from Lackawanna, New York
21st-century American businesspeople
New Orleans Saints announcers
Ed Block Courage Award recipients
People from Medford, New Jersey